Woburn Collegiate Institute (Woburn CI, WCI, or Woburn) is a semestered, English-language public secondary school on Ellesmere Road in the Woburn neighbourhood of the Scarborough district of Toronto, Ontario, Canada operated by the Toronto District School Board. From its inception in 1963 until 1998, it was operated by the Scarborough Board of Education.

It has 919 students . The school motto is "", which is Latin for "Let the Zeal for Learning Flourish".

History 

By 1847, when Scarborough had grown to the point where an education system was more organized than the township's original, and a single school was required. The township established 16 School Sections, of which SS # 6 included the Woburn community. A school, also designated SS #6, was erected on Markham Road, just north of the 2nd Concession (Ellesmere Road). It was a one-story frame structure,  with windows for light and a wood stove for heat. Between 1850 and 1862, Alexander Muir taught at SS #6. He composed The Maple Leaf Forever, which for many years was Canada's unofficial national anthem; hence the maple leaf in the school crest.

The second SS # 6, Woburn Public School, was built on the site in 1863. In 1895, an addition to the back of the building expanded it to two rooms. A few years later, the convenience of two outdoor privies was finally added. The school operated this way until 1956. By then, though, the old school just could not keep up with the demands of modern education or with the enrollment resulting from suburban development which had reached the area in the 1950s.

When the Scarborough Board of Education was formed in 1954, additional land for another new Woburn school was acquired for $21,000. In 1960, before the new school was built, it was officially named "Woburn Collegiate Institute". The Woburn building was designed by architects Parrott, Tambling and Witmer, and a construction contract worth $1.4 million was awarded in 1962 to Louis Donolo Ontario Ltd. The previous 1863-vintage S.S. # 6 was later demolished.

Woburn Collegiate Institute opened on September 3, 1963, as Scarborough's ninth collegiate to a total enrollment of 443 students, and the ceremonial opening took place on November 28, 1963. Two major additions were completed at a cost of $2.6 million in 1965 and 1969, including a new auditorium and auto shop. In 1973, school enrollment reached a peak of 2,302 students.

In 1998, the SBE ceased to exist and Woburn Collegiate became part of the newly minted Toronto District School Board. In May 2013, Woburn C.I. celebrated its 50th anniversary.

On 31 October 2022, a school shooting occurred near the front entrance, killing one and seriously injuring another. The dead victim was a former student who attended Lester B. Pearson Collegiate Institute.

Overview

Campus 

The school also has a main office, a guidance office (student services) and an office for each of its departments. The building encloses a garden quadrangle, known by the students as "The Quad", which has a statue by Romanian-Canadian sculptor Sorel Etrog entitled "Soma". Identical statues can be found inside the Yonge-Eglinton Centre and York University's Accolade East building. Behind the school is a 400-m track, football field and goalposts for outdoor sports activities.

Students 
, Woburn has 919 students. The school has also been the home for Scarborough's secondary gifted programme for exceptional students since 1978.

Extracurricular activities

Student Activity Council (SAC) 

The SAC is selected by the Woburn students:
 to represent their interests
 to support and fund their sports and clubs
 to organize special activities within the school

The SAC represents Woburn students at the school and in the community. The SAC organizes social activities and encourages school spirit. In the past SAC events have included dances, Charity Week activities, Spirit Week activities, Carnival, Woburn's Got Talent, Spirit Days, Grade 12 BBQ and the Semi-Formal. Funding for all clubs and most sports teams comes from the sale of SAC/ID cards and from fund-raising activities.

Prefects 
Prefects are the good-will ambassadors of Woburn.  Working closely with faculty, the Prefects of Woburn are responsible for making sure school events run smoothly, such as Welcome Day, photo days, and other various fairs such as the career and volunteer fairs.  Furthermore, the Prefects also plan an annual event for the children at Woburn Jr. called Springfest.

Woburn Robotics 
Woburn Robotics, formally known as Team 188, gathers every year to take part in the FIRST Robotics Competition,  an international contest that teams students up with engineers and sponsors from local businesses to develop skills in science, technology, marketing, and leadership.  In six intense weeks the team brainstorms, designs, constructs, and tests its 120-pound robot for the competition, whose objective is different every year.  The robots are then immediately shipped off to compete in other tournaments. Team 188 is also an active participant in the VEX Robotics Competition, an annual precursor to the FIRST championship.

Academics
Woburn Collegiate Institute is a Grade 9 to 12 school operates on a non-semestered system. From its founding until 2003, it had Grade 13, which was morphed into the Ontario Academic Credit (OAC) in 1984.

Mathematics 
The flagship subject of Woburn academics is a part of many Woburn student's lives, and it is rightfully considered an extracurricular activity in itself. Perhaps the best method to describe Woburn's strength in mathematics is to look at the school's representation in the International Mathematical Olympiads (IMO). Canada first began sending the now six-member team to the event in 1981. Beginning with Woburn's first student representation at the event in 1986, over the next 18 years Woburn would be represented at the IMO an impressive eleven times, exceeding the representations of more famous academically elite high schools such as Earl Haig Secondary School (seven times), and Upper Canada College (five times).

Physics and Chemistry 
In addition to the IMO, Woburn students have also gone on to represent Canada in the International Chemistry Olympiads (IChO) and International Physics Olympiads (IPhO).

Programming Enrichment Group (PEG) 
Woburn is noted for its excellence in computer science. PEG is a group of students who meet on a weekly basis after school to study advanced computer science topics, discuss algorithms and approaches to difficult problems, often on the level of the International Olympiad in Informatics (at which Woburn has been represented a total of twenty times). Topics covered and types of problems approached vary depending on competition entries.

The learning methods used vary as well: sometimes students meet in study groups with their leader teaching them and solving practice sheets or programming problems, sometimes they are taught by one of the senior students, sometimes they work on the problem as a team, and sometimes they are taught by their coaches.

PEG students meet after school typically two nights per week to prepare for competitions in programming. Every year, members take part in competitions at provincial, national and international levels. PEG started its own competition in 1995, called the Woburn Challenge, to draw in both students from other schools and university students. This contest had grown to become province-wide (occasionally wider). The Woburn Challenge was discontinued in 2002 and restarted in October 2015.

Since its formation in the early 1990s, PEG has participated in a large number of competitions.

Woburn Music 
The school is notable for its music programme, consisting of several hundred students in band and choir classes, a Madrigal Choir, a concert choir, a Chamber Choir, two concert bands, a Wind Ensemble, a jazz band and a jazz combo.

The ensembles of the music programme have regularly been invited to perform at national-level competitions and often make excursions to the US, including Orlando, Florida in mid-May 2006. The Wind Ensemble and Madrigal Choir have done particularly well in competitions, consistently placing at or near the top of the standings. On February 17, 2006, the Wind Ensemble travelled to the Musicfest competition held at the Le Parc Hotel, in Markham, Ontario, playing at the highest level, B500. The band received a gold rating.

Woburn's music department is student-represented by way of the Music Council, a body of elected students who help to keep the programme running smoothly. The Council plans and runs many events and fundraisers through the year.

In May 2012, Woburn's Festival Chorus, Festival Winds and Jazz band performed at MusicFest Nationals in Ottawa, Ontario. All three ensembles received a silver award.

Woburn Rookie Drama Festival 
The Woburn Rookie Drama Festival (usually just called Rookie) is a festival of short plays held annually every spring at Woburn.  The most notable part of the festival is that all of its plays are directed, acted, crewed, and sometimes written entirely by students with no teacher assistance.  Furthermore, students do all of the organization required to put on the festival each year and act as Masters of Ceremony. At over 40 years old, it is among the longest running high school clubs in the city. The first Woburn Rookie Drama Festival took place in the spring of 1963 and was overseen by then drama teacher John Wilcox.

Any student who wants to direct a play is automatically accepted. A month before the festival, there is an open audition during which actors perform short scenes that are either improved or done with only a short time to prepare. Directors request the actors they want, and the organizers assign actors to plays (often the most popular actors are assigned to several plays in smaller roles). The festival itself lasts for one to three evenings with two to four plays per night. There are usually short scenes between plays.
Every year the festival has a theme chosen by the organizers. Sometimes the plays themselves are sometimes related to the theme, but normally the theme only applies to the short scenes between plays while the next cast is setting up. These scenes are usually directed or starring the MCs.

The Three Rs
At Woburn, the school has the Three Rs system:
Respect for Self
Respect for Others
Responsibility for their actions

Notable alumni 

Brad Duguid – former Liberal MPP for Scarborough Centre
Aman Hambleton - Chess Grandmaster and Chessbrah founder 
Ludwig Heimrath Jr. – race car driver, started 30 CART races between 1984 and 1989, as well as three Indy 500 races with a best finish of 13th in 1989
Charlie Huddy – former NHL hockey player
Prakash John – rock bassist
Steve Kouleas – sports broadcaster for The Score
Holly Lewis — actress
Des McAnuff – artistic director of the Stratford Shakespeare Festival
Bob McKenzie – Sports broadcaster for TSN
Steve Page – former member of the band Barenaked Ladies
Steve Payne – Former NHL hockey player
Ed Robertson – member of the band Barenaked Ladies
Jeff Rosenthal – University of Toronto statistics professor and author
Monika Schnarre – model, actress and television host
Laura Schuler — Canadian Olympic hockey player and NCAA hockey coach
Leslie Seaforth – rapper, DJ, and producer known as More Or Les
Sudz Sutherland — Director and screenwriter
Brad Tapper – former NHL hockey player
Dennis Timbrell – former Conservative MPP and Ontario cabinet minister
Asha Tomlinson - award-winning investigative journalist with CBC

See also
List of high schools in Ontario

References

External links
 Woburn Collegiate Institute
 TDSB Profile
 Woburn Robotics
 Woburn Alumni
 Woburn Music
 Woburn's Students Towards Reducing Impaired Driving Everywhere (STRIDE)

High schools in Toronto
Schools in the TDSB
Gifted education
Education in Scarborough, Toronto
Educational institutions established in 1963
1963 establishments in Ontario